The 2007–08 season was the 105th in the history of the Southern League, which is an English football competition featuring semi-professional and amateur clubs from the South West, South Central and Midlands of England and South Wales.

Premier Division
The Premier Division consisted of 22 clubs, including 17 clubs from the previous season and five new clubs:
Two clubs promoted from Division One Midlands:
Brackley Town
Bromsgrove Rovers

Two clubs promoted from Division One South & West:
Bashley
Swindon Supermarine

Plus:
Bedford Town, relegated from the Conference South

King's Lynn won the Southern League Premier and were promoted to the Conference North, while play-off winners Team Bath were promoted to the Conference South. Bromsgrove Rovers, Cirencester Town and Cheshunt were relegated to Division One. Bedford Town also ended the season in the relegation zone but were reprieved from the second relegation in a row after Football Conference clubs Halifax Town folded and Nuneaton Borough were demoted to Division One Midlands.

League table

Play-offs

Results

Stadia and locations

Division One Midlands
Division One Midlands consisted of 21 clubs, including 18 clubs from previous season and three new clubs:
Two clubs promoted from the Midland Alliance:
Leamington
Romulus

Plus:
Chesham United, transferred from Division One South & West
Slimbridge, promoted from the Hellenic League

Also, shortly before the start of the season Slimbridge withdrew and were not replaced. Therefore, the relegation zone was reduced to one place in order to make up the numbers for the next season.

Evesham United won the division and were promoted to the Premier Division along with play-off winners Stourbridge, who returned to the top Southern League division after the relegation in 1984. Berkhamsted finished bottom of the table and were the only club relegated this season.

League table

Play-offs

Stadia and locations

Division One South & West
Division One South & West consisted of 22 clubs, including 16 clubs from previous season and six new clubs:
Bridgwater Town, promoted from the Western League
Farnborough, demoted from the Conference South
Fleet Town, transferred from Isthmian League Division One South
Godalming Town, transferred from Isthmian League Division One South
Gosport Borough, promoted from the Wessex League
Slough Town, relegated from Isthmian League Premier Division

Also, Brook House were renamed A.F.C. Hayes prior to the start of the season.

Farnborough, who had been demoted from the Conference South at the end of the previous season, won the division and were promoted to the Premier Division along with play-off winners Oxford City. Slough Town finished in the relegation zone for the second season in a row, but this time were reprieved due to the expulsion of Halifax Town from the Football Conference, so only Newport (Isle of Wight) were relegated this season.

League table

Play-offs

Stadia and locations

League Cup

First round
42 clubs, (all of the Division One Midlands and all but one of the Division One South & West clubs), entered at the first round. Bridgwater Town did not enter at this stage because there were only 21 clubs in Division One Midlands.

Second round
The 12 fixtures of the Second Round were played on the weekend of 30 October 2007. Joining the winners of the previous round were Bridgwater Town, plus Chippenham Town and Gloucester City from the Premier Division.

Third round

Fourth round

Quarter-finals
The quarter-finals were played on 12 February 2008.

Semi-finals
The semi-finals were played on 4 March 2008.

Final
The first leg was played on 8 April 2008, with the second leg on 22 April 2008.

See also
Southern Football League
2007–08 Isthmian League
2007–08 Northern Premier League

Southern Football League seasons
7